Hussain Angelo Koko Nimer (Arabic: حسين أنجلو كوكو نمر) was a Sudanese middle-distance track and field athlet. He competed in the 400 m, 800 m and 4 × 400 m events at the 1968 and 1972 Summer Olympics, but was unfortunate to reach the finals.

References

2. 

Sudanese male sprinters
Sudanese male middle-distance runners
1947 births
Living people
Olympic athletes of Sudan
Athletes (track and field) at the 1968 Summer Olympics
Athletes (track and field) at the 1972 Summer Olympics
Mohamed Hussain Angelo